The Farm Boyz is an album released by rapper, Keak da Sneak. It was released on October 22, 2002, for Out of Bounds Records and was produced by Keak da Sneak, Big Hollis and Mark Knox.

Track listing
"Interlude"- 3:21  
"Go Head Baby"- 4:16  
"Getta Way"- 4:10  
"Rap 4 Runnin' the Game"- 3:32  
"U Not a Hoe"- 5:33  
"High Tech Fashion"- 4:01  
"On Mine"- 0:30  
"Shitin' on Em'- 6:21  
"U Know U Wit It"- 3:03  
"Million Dollar Heights"- 3:31  
"Yadameen"- 3:34  
"Call Da' Police"- 4:14

2002 albums
Keak da Sneak albums
Albums produced by Big Hollis